Dimitar Janakiew Inkiow (Bulgarian: Димитър Янакиев Инкьов; Haskovo, 10 October 1932 – Munich, 24 September 2006) was a Bulgarian writer.

He studied mining engineering and later in Sofia's Drama Academy, where he was graduated as drama director. He wrote several theatrical plays before having to leave the country in 1965 for problems he had with the government. He moved to Germany (Munich) until 1991 and was script writer for Radio freies Europa (Radio Free Europe) in Munich.

He wrote more than 100 books which have been translated to more than 25 languages, like his famous saga "Ich und meine Schwester Klara" ("Me and My Sister Clara")

Works
Die Puppe die ein Baby haben wollte / Куклата, която искаше да си има бебе, 1974
Geheimformel 101 Planet der kleinen Menschen. Franz Schneider Verlag, München 1978. 
Das fliegende Kamel und andere Geschichten. Franz Schneider Verlag, München 1979. 
Miria und Räuber Karabum, 1974
Der kleine Jäger, 1975
Transi Schraubenzieher, 1975
Transi hat'ne Schraube locker, 1976
Reise nach Peperonien, 1977
Ich und meine Schwester Klara/ Аз и моята сестра Клара. Erika Klopp Verlag, Berlin 1977, 
Ich und Klara und der Kater Kasimir/ Аз, Клара и котаракът Казимир. Erika Klopp Verlag, Berlin 1978, 
Ic
Ich und Klara und das Pony Balduin, 1979
Ich und Klara und der Papagei Pippo, 1981
Ich und Klara und der Dackel Schnuffi. Erika Klopp Verlag, Berlin 1978, 
Ich und Klara und das Pony Balduin. Erika Klopp Verlag, Berlin 1979, 
Ich und Klara und der Papagei Pippo. Erika Klopp Verlag, Berlin 1981, 
Ich und meine Schwester Klara. Die schönsten Geschichten. Klopp, München 1989. 
Ich und meine Schwester Klara. Die lustigsten Tiergeschichten. Klopp, München 1994. 
Kunterbunte Traumgeschichten, 1978
Planet der kleinen Menschen, 1978
Klub der Unsterblichen, 1978
Das Geheimnis der Gedankenleser, 1979
Der grunzende König, 1979
Das fliegende Kamel, 1979
Der versteckte Sonnenstrahl, 1980
Fünf fürchterliche Raubergeschichten, 1980
Eine Kuh geht auf Reisen, 1981
Leo der Lachlöwe, 1981
Leo der Lachlöwe im Schlaraffenland,1982
Ich, der Riese, und der Zwerg Schnips, 1981
Ich, der Riese, und der große Schreck, 1982
Der Hase im Glück, 1982
Maus und Katz, 1983
Kleiner Bär mit Zauberbrille, 1983
Ein Igel im Spiegel, 1984
Hurra, unser Baby ist da,1984
Hurra, Susanne hat Zähne, 1985
Die fliegenden Bratwürstchen, 1985
Meine Schwester Klara und die Geister,1982
Meine Schwester Klara und der Löwenschwanz,1982
Meine Schwester Klara und die Pfütze, 1982
Meine Schwester Klara und der Haifisch, 1983
Meine Schwester Klara und ihr Schutzengel,1983
Meine Schwester Klara und der Schneemann,1984
Meine Schwester Klara und ihr Geheimnis, 1984
Meine Schwester Klara und das liebe Geld, 1985
Meine Schwester Klara und die große Wanderung, 1985
Meine Schwester Klara und ihre Kochlöffel, 1986
Meine Schwester Klara und das Lachwürstchen, 1987
Die Karottennase, 1986
Was kostet die Welt – Geschichten ums Geld /История на парите/, 1986
Erzähl mir vom Fliegen, 1986
Erzähl mir vom Wasser. Die Abenteuer von Plimp und Plomp,1986
Erzähl mir von der Erde. Eine Geisterreise um die Welt, 1987
Erzähl mir vom Rad. Wie das Rad ins Rollen kam, 1987
Peter und die Menschenzähnefresser, 1987
Gullivers wundersame Reise auf die Insel Liliput,1987
Meine Schwester Klara und der Osterhase, 1988
Susanne ist die Frechste, 1988
Die Katze fahrt in Urlaub, 1988
Erzahl mir von der Sonne.Ein Sonnenstrahl auf großer Fahrt,1988
Meine Schwester Klara und die geschenkte Maus, 1988
Meine Schwester Klara und der Piratenschatz, 1988
Der singende Kater. Neue Maus- und Katzengeschichten, 1989
Meine Schwester Klara und Oma Müllers Himbeeren, 1989
Das Buch erobert die Welt, 1990
"Inkiow's schönstes Lesebuch", 1990 /1993
Pipsi und Elvira. Ganz neue Katz- und Maus-Geschichten, 1990
Meine Schwester Klara und ihre Mäusezucht, 1990
Ich und meine Schwester Klara.Die schönsten Geschichten,1989
Meine Schwester Klara ist Umweltschützerin, 1990
Ich hab dich ganz stark lieb, Susanne, 1990
Mein Opa, sein Esel und ich, 1990
Das kluge Mädchen und der Zar, 1990
Herkules, der stärkste Mann der Welt (Griechische Sagen), 1991
Die Katze läßt das Mausen nicht (Fabeln nach Aesop),1991
Ein Kater spielt Klavier, 1991
Ich bin Susannes großer Bruder, 1991
Inkiows schlaues Buch fur schlaue Kinder, 1991
Das Buch vom Fliegen, 1991
Das sprechende Auto,1992
Meine Schwester Klara und der lustige Popo, 1992
Filio der Baum, 1992
Meine Schwester Klara ist die Größte! 1992
Der Widder mit dem goldenen Fell, 1992
Wie Siegfried den Drachen besiegte. Europäische Sagen,1993
Ist die Erde rund? Geschichten fur Neugierige, 1993
Der Prinz mit der goldenen Flöte. Schulbuch fur Klassensatze),1993
Der bebrillte Rabe, 1993
Antonius wird Mauspatenonkel,1993
Meine Schwester Klara und das große Pferd, 1993
Hund und Floh – Die hüpfenden Gäste,	1993
Wie groß ist die Erde?, 1993
Die Gänse, der Fuchs und der Luchs, 1994
Meine Schwester Klara erzählt Witze, 1994
Das Abc-Zauberbuch, 1994
Der großte Esel, 1994
Das Krokodil am Nil, 1994
Lustige Abc Geschichten, 1994
Ich und meine Schwester Klara –  Die lustigsten Tiergeschichten,1994
Meine Schwester Klara und das Fahrrad, 1995
Das Kaninchen und der Frosch, 1995
Das Mädchen mit den viereckigen Augen,1995
Meine Schwester Klara stellt immer was an, 1995
Die Glücksschweine/Eine Maus im Haus, 1996
Die fliegende Schildkrote, 1996
 Die Abenteuer des Odisseus, 1999
 Orpheis, Sysiphos und &, 2001
 Aespos Fabeln, 1999
 Ein wunderschöner, schlechter Tag, 2001
 Krokodilbauchbesichtigung,	2001
 Achtung! Menschenzähnefresser, 2003
 Klara und Ich in Amerika,	2003
 Die Bibel fur Kinder, 2003
 Aesops Fabeln oder Die Weisheit der Antike, 2004
 Велко Верин – Фейлетони, 2000 – CD
 Ботуш Каишев и другите, 2003, 
 Ботуш Каишев и новото време, 2004

CD:
 Ilias. Igel Records. Nominierung für den Deutschen Hörbuchpreis 2006.
 Die Abenteuer des Odysseus. Igel Records.
 "Die Heldentaten des Herkules". Igel Records.
 Griechische Sagen I. Igel Records.
 Griechische Sagen II. Igel Records.
 Griechische Sagen III. Igel Records.
 Aesops Fabeln". Igel Records.
 Die Götter des Olymp. Igel Records.
 Die Katze lässt das Mausen nicht. Igel Records.
 Die Bibel – Das alte Testament. Igel Records.
 Die Bibel – Das neue Testament''. Igel Records.

External links 
 German National Library Catalogue
 http://www.deutscherhoerbuchpreis.de

1932 births
2006 deaths
Bulgarian journalists
Bulgarian writers
German-language writers
German people of Bulgarian descent
People from Haskovo
20th-century journalists